Joseph Omer Wildor Larochelle (September 3, 1905 in Sorel, Quebec –  March 21, 1964) was a Canadian ice hockey forward.

Larochelle started his National Hockey League career with the Montreal Canadiens in 1925.  He also played with the Chicago Black Hawks.  He went on to win two Stanley Cups with Montreal in 1930 and 1931.  He retired after the 1937 season. Birthday confirmed at SIHR.

External links

1905 births
1964 deaths
Canadian ice hockey right wingers
Chicago Blackhawks players
Ice hockey people from Quebec
Montreal Canadiens players
Sportspeople from Sorel-Tracy
Stanley Cup champions